was a Japanese actor. He had participated twice in the Dakar Rally as a racing driver.

He did a lot of work for the Toho Company and made his debut in the film The H-Man. He appeared in Akira Kurosawa's Yojimbo in 1961. In the same year, he received the Elan d'or Award for Newcomer of the Year. In the 1970s, he left Toho and joined Toshiro Mifune's production company. He was famous for his role in the police TV drama G-Men '75 as well as Toho Studios monster movies.

Selected filmography

Films

The H-Man (1958) - Man, witness on rainy day
Otona niwa wakaranai: Seishun hakusho (1958)
Mikkokusha wa dare ka (1958) - Keiichi Sudô
Ankokugai no kaoyaku (1959) - Kashimura's assistant
Daigaku no oneechan (1959) - Lucky Nakaki
Kitsune to tanuki (1959)
Daigaku no nijuhachin (1959)
Seishun o kakero (1959) - Hurry Ken
Wakai koibitotachi (1959) - Tôru Akimoto
Dokuritsu gurentai (1959)
Osorubeki hiasobi (1959)
Bakushô Mito Kômon man'yûki (1959) - Kakunoshin Atsumi
The Last Gunfight (1960) - Officer Miake
Samurai to oneechan (1960) - Shôsuke Fuyuki
Yama no kanata ni - Dai ichi-bu: Ringo no hoo: Dai ni-bu: Sakana no seppun (1960) - Kôichi Shimura
Kunisada Chûji (1960) - Sentaro Itabashi
Storm Over the Pacific (1960) - Lt. Koji Kitami
Fundoshi isha (1960) - Hangoro
Ôzora no yarôdomo (1960)
Shin jôdaigaku (1960)
Autumn Has Already Started (1960) - Shotaro Yamada
Sararîman Chûshingura (1960) - Riki Oishi
The Story of Osaka Castle (1961) - Chomonshu Kimura
Wakai ôkami (1961) - Nobuo Kawamoto
Minami no kaze to nami (1961) - Junpei Hara
Zoku sararîman Chûshingura (1961) - Chikara
Yojimbo (1961) - Kohei's Son
Dangai no ketto (1961)
Kurenai no umi (1961)
Onna bakari no yoru (1961) - Hayakawa
Gen to fudômyô-ô (1961)
Yato kaze no naka o hashiru (1961) - Taro
Hoero datsugokushu (1961)
Salary man Shimizu minato (1962) - Shingo Oiwake
Onna no za (1962) - Aoyama Yutaka
Zoku sararîman shimizu minato (1962)
Kurenai no sora (1962)
Dobunezumi sakusen (1962)
Kigeki ekimae onsen (1962) - Kôtarô Takami
Chikata nikki (1962)
Yama-neko sakusen (1962)
Chūshingura: Hana no Maki, Yuki no Maki (1962) - Kin'emon Okano
Ankokugai no kiba (1962)
Attack Squadron! (1963) - Captain Nobuo Ataka
Chintao yôsai bakugeki meirei (1963)
Dokuritsu kikanjûtai imada shagekichu (1963)
Interpol Code 8 (1963) - Akimoto
Norainu sakusen (1963)
Warera sarariman (1963)
Whirlwind (1964) - Kiyonosuke
Kyô mo ware ôzora ni ari (1964)
Jigoku sakusen (1964)
Chi to daiyamondo (1964)
Dogora (1964) - Inspector Kommei
Ghidorah, the Three-Headed Monster (1964) - Detective Shindo
Kokkura suzumaru (1965)
Kokusai himitsu keisatsu: Kagi no kagi (1965)
Jinchoge (1966) - Nomura
Kore ga seishun da! (1966) - Shinsuke Yuki
Take-chan shacho (1967, part 1, 2)
Dekkai taiyô (1967)
Natsukashiki fue ya taiko (1967)
Moero! Taiyô (1967)
Moero! Seishun (1968) - Kensuke Sunaga
Musume zakari (1969) - Takashi Watanabe
Oiroke komikku (1970)
Batsugun joshikôsei (1970, part 1, 2) - Shunsuke Takimura
Circuit no ohkami (1977)
Bokusâ (1977)
Kochira Katsushika-ku Kameari kôen mae hashutsujo (1977)
Jerashî gêmu (1982) - Shinichi Suruga
Keiji monogatari 3 - Shiosai no uta (1984)
The Return of Godzilla (1984) - Professor Makoto Hayashida
Seito shokun! (1984) - Seishi Hokujo
Godzilla 1985 (1985) - Dr. Hayashida
Ore wa otokoda! kanketsu-hen (1987)
Ai wa kurosuoba (1987)
Umi e (1988)
Private Lessons II (1993)
Round 1 (2003)
Shinario raitâ (star) Matsumoto Mariko no kadai (2005)
The Passenger (2005) - Naoki Sando
Sô kamo shirenai (2005)
Maze (2006)
Miseuteo Robin ggosigi (2006) - Mi Jeu-yo-si
Black Belt (2007) - Eiken Shibahara
Half Blood Samurai (2008)
The Monster X Strikes Back/Attack the G8 Summit (2008)
Sakura Sakura (2010)
Sayonara natsu yasumi (2010)
Kirin (2012) - (final film role)
Mifune: The Last Samurai (2015, Documentary) - Himself

Television
 G-Men '75 (1975-1979) - Odagiri
 Edo no Gekitou (1979)
 Doberman Deka (1980) - Masamichi Nishiya
 Shōgun (1980) - Zataki
 Tokugawa Ieyasu (1983) - Yagyū Munenori

References

External links

1936 births
2018 deaths
20th-century Japanese male actors
21st-century Japanese male actors
Male actors from Tokyo
Japanese male film actors
Japanese male television actors